Ondrej Binder (11 April 1970 – 13 May 2016) was a Slovak politician for the People's Party – Our Slovakia. He was elected in the 2016 election to the National Council of Slovakia. He served in this position until he died in a car crash several months later. He was born and died in Banská Štiavnica.

References

1970 births
2016 deaths
People's Party Our Slovakia politicians
Members of the National Council (Slovakia) 2016-2020
People from Banská Štiavnica District